"San Juan Romero" is a short story by the Brazilian writer Rita Maria Felix da Silva. It is also the name of the fictional Mexican village the story features, and it was the first story to feature the recurring character "Sir James Winterwood".  In the tale, Winterwood arrives in San Juan Romero after his adventures throughout North America.  Soon he learns about the terrible curse that haunted the village, concerning a nasty secret involving the people of that land, originally a group of miners. 
Since this tale deals with the evil in the human heart, it has been termed a "metaphysical western". 
The writer Romeu Martins classified this short story as a work in the genre Weird Western. Another curious feature of this story is a mention of one member of the literary version of the Whitehill family.

Readers of the story have varyingly placed the village either near the Mexican frontier with the United States or farther south towards Central America.

See also
El Ray

External links
 San Juan Romero published in Cidade Phantastica - text in Portuguese Language
 About San Juan Romero - text in Portuguese Language

Brazilian short stories
Fictional populated places in Mexico